Bengaluru North Lok Sabha constituency is one of the 28 Lok Sabha (lower house of the Indian Parliament) constituencies in the South Indian state of Karnataka.  This constituency has been known by different names in its history. For the 1951 and every election since 1977 it has been known as Bengaluru North. For the 1957 and 1962 elections it was known as Bengaluru City. For the 1967 and 1971 elections it formed a constituency jointly with Bengaluru South and was known as Bengaluru. From 1951–73, this constituency resided in Mysuru State. On 1 November 1973, Mysuru State was renamed as Karnataka.

Bengaluru North held its first elections in 1951 and its first member of parliament (MP) was Keshava Iyengar of the Indian National Congress (INC). He was re-elected in the next election in 1957. K. Hanumanthaiya also of the INC represented this constituency for three consecutive terms from 1962 to 1977. C. K. Jaffer Sharief of the INC was its MP for five consecutive terms from 1977–1996 before being denied ticket in the 1996 election. C. Narayanaswamy of the Janata Dal party defeated Mohammed Obedulla Sharief.

This brought to an end a 45-year period where this constituency had been represented by a member of the INC from 1951–96. Sharief became the MP once again in 1998. He was also re-elected in 1999 to serve his seventh term as MP for this constituency. H. T. Sangliana of the Bharatiya Janata Party (BJP) represented this constituency in 2004. D. B. Chandre Gowda also of the BJP was elected in the 2009 election. As of the latest elections in 2019, its current MP is D. V. Sadananda Gowda of the BJP who was also the incumbent Minister of Chemicals and Fertilizers. Of the 17 elections held in this constituency, the most successful party is the INC who have won on 12 occasions.

Assembly segments

As of 2014, Bengaluru North Lok Sabha constituency comprises the following eight Legislative Assembly segments:

Members of Parliament

Election results

General election 1951

General election 1957

General election 1962

General election 1967

General election 1971

General election 1977

General election 1980

General election 1984

General election 1989

General election 1991

General election 1996

General election 1998

General election 1999

General election 2004

General election 2009

General election 2014

General election 2019

See also
 Bangalore
 List of constituencies of the Lok Sabha

References

External links
Bangalore North lok sabha  constituency election 2019 date and schedule

Lok Sabha constituencies in Karnataka
Bangalore